Fabiana da Silva (born 27 July 1988) is a Brazilian badminton player.

Achievements

Pan American Games 
Women's doubles

Pan Am Championships 
Women's singles

Women's doubles

Mixed doubles

South American Games 
Women's singles

Women's doubles

BWF International Challenge/Series (14 titles, 25 runner-up) 
Women's singles

Women's doubles

Mixed doubles

  BWF International Challenge tournament
  BWF International Series tournament
  BWF Future Series tournament

References

External links 
 
 Confederação Brasileira de Badminton Atleta

1988 births
Living people
Sportspeople from Niterói
Brazilian female badminton players
Badminton players at the 2020 Summer Olympics
Olympic badminton players of Brazil
Badminton players at the 2011 Pan American Games
Badminton players at the 2015 Pan American Games
Badminton players at the 2019 Pan American Games
Pan American Games bronze medalists for Brazil
Pan American Games medalists in badminton
Medalists at the 2019 Pan American Games
Competitors at the 2010 South American Games
Competitors at the 2018 South American Games
South American Games gold medalists for Brazil
South American Games silver medalists for Brazil
South American Games medalists in badminton
21st-century Brazilian women